Krokodil was a satirical magazine published in the Soviet Union.

Krokodil may also refer to:

 Krokodil (game show), a Russian game show on Muz-TV channel
 Krokodil Literary Festival, an annual event in Belgrade, Serbia
 Krokodil, a 1970s Swiss band on the Nurse with Wound list
 Mil Mi-24, a helicopter, nicknamed Крокодил or Krokodil due to its camouflage scheme
 Crocodile (locomotive) (German Krokodil), an electric locomotive
 "Krokodil", a 2012 single released by St. Vincent
 Krokodil, the street name for desomorphine, a dangerous and illicit opioid

See also 
 Krokodiloes, an a cappella group at Harvard University 
 Crocodile (disambiguation)